Retford Football Club is an English football club based in Retford, Nottinghamshire.

History
The club was formed in 2015. They joined the Central Midlands League and entered the FA Vase for the first time a year later.

Retford FC were crowned champions of the Central Midlands North Division 2018/19 season

2019/20 season will see them play in the Northern Counties East League Division One.

Stadium
The club moved to The Rail in 2017 after ground sharing with Retford United.

The ground has been developed over the short time they have been in situ with floodlights installed, an all seater stand and the necessary requirements for ground grading for the Northern Counties East League all met.

The ground is adjacent to the East Coast Main Line where it can be viewed from the trains passing, and a good vantage point of the ground is from the road bridge on Babworth Road.

Honours
Central Midlands League
North Division champions 2018–19

Records

Record attendance: 706 vs. Retford United, Central Midlands League, 2018–19

References

External links
Official website

Football clubs in England
Football clubs in Nottinghamshire
Central Midlands Football League
Association football clubs established in 2015
2015 establishments in England
Retford